Air transport in the United Kingdom is the commercial carriage of passengers, freight and mail by aircraft, both within the United Kingdom (UK) and between the UK and the rest of the world. In the past 25 years the industry has seen continuous growth, and the demand for passenger air travel in particular is forecast to increase from the current level of 236 million passengers to 465 million in 2030. One airport, Heathrow Airport, is amongst the top ten busiest airports in the world. More than half of all passengers travelling by air in the UK currently travel via the six London area airports. Outside London, Manchester Airport is by far the largest and busiest of the remaining airports, acting as a hub for the 20 million or so people who live within a two-hour drive. Regional airports have experienced the most growth in recent years, due to the success of low-cost carrier airlines over the last decade.

In 2013 the UK had the third highest number of passengers carried of any country, behind only the United States and China.

20th century: nationalisation and privatisation
Imperial Airways and British Airways Limited were merged and nationalised as British Overseas Airways Corporation in 1939.

In the 1970s, aircraft manufacturers were merged and nationalised as British Aerospace.

In the 1980s, British Airways and British Aerospace were privatised again by the Thatcher government.

1990s: Advent of no-frills airlines
The advent in the mid-1990s of 'no-frills' carriers, such as easyJet and BA's Go, has had a significant impact on air travel in the UK. In 2005 these airlines carried 77.5 million passengers, up from just 4.3 million in 1996. They are responsible for the growth of regional airports, operating from 35 airports in 2006 compared to 10 in 1996, and increasing the choice of international destinations, serving 150 in 2006, compared to 12 a decade earlier. The annual rate of growth in the overall demand for air travel has remained stable since 1975, and current growth is being served by the no-frills airlines at the expense of traditional carriers which, since 2000, have experienced flat or declining traffic levels. In response, traditional carriers have lowered costs to compete more effectively on price, leading to lower prices on the short haul routes served by this sector, especially in business fares. They have also limited or reduced capacity and in some cases launched no-frills subsidiaries of their own.

21st century

Airports

Although the number of airports in the UK runs into hundreds, many are smaller aerodromes dealing with general aviation rather than air transport. In terms of the latter, statistics are collected from 59 main airports, and the largest concentration of services is located in the London and South East of England areas. Heathrow is the largest airport in the country, handling over 67 million terminal passengers in 2006, making it the third busiest airport in the world, and the busiest if measured by the number of international passengers. Nearly a third of all overseas residents visiting the UK enter the country via this airport, which also handles more than a fifth of all overseas visits by UK residents.
Heathrow is also a cargo gateway and usually has up to 20 dedicated cargo aircraft using its facilities every day. The largest of which is DHL who also lease cargo aircraft to British Airways for weekend operations.
 Gatwick airport, with 34 million terminal passengers, is the second largest in the country, eighth busiest in the world and lays claim to the busiest single runway airport in the world. Between them the five London airports handle nearly 137 million terminal passengers, 59 per cent of the national total. As far as dedicated cargo services are concerned, Stansted and East Midlands airports have both experienced large growth in freight handling over the past decade, and these two airports are the major hubs for express freight operations.Outside London and the South East, the use of regional airports has increased dramatically in recent years, with the amount of air traffic using these facilities doubling in the period 1995 to 2005. To illustrate this growth, in the five years from 2001 passenger numbers at the regional airports of Exeter Airport, Bristol Airport, and Newcastle Airport increased by 191 per cent, 113 per cent, and 60 per cent respectively. In the same period the largest airports experienced some of the slowest growth, with Heathrow passenger numbers increasing by 11 per cent, and those of Gatwick increasing by less than 10 per cent.

Airlines

The vast majority of all passengers travelling by air to or from the UK are carried by UK airlines, of which there are around forty, and at the end of 2006 the UK air transport fleet numbered 963 aircraft, flying just under 1.2 million flights and averaging over eight hours of flying daily. Together the two largest airlines as measured by passenger numbers; British Airways and easyJet, account for nearly half of the 127 million passengers flown on UK airlines. In terms of capacity, both available and used, British Airways is again the largest airline, whilst easyJet is pushed into third place by Virgin Atlantic. British Airways passenger flights also account for over 50 per cent of all cargo carried by UK airlines, and when combined with its cargo operations the airline carries over 60 per cent of all cargo carried by UK airlines.

Passenger travel
Just over a fifth of all terminal passengers are travelling on domestic routes only, whilst half are travelling between the UK and the rest of the European Union (EU). Of the latter, travel between the UK and Spain, France, Germany and Italy account for around half, with Spain almost matching the other three combined in terms of passenger numbers. Outside the EU, the US, the Far East, Switzerland and the Middle East together account for just over half of all passengers flying between the UK and the rest of the world, with the USA exceeding the other three combined in terms of passenger numbers. Air travel is the most popular mode of transport for visitors both to and from the UK. In 2005 it was used for 80 per cent of all visits by UK residents travelling overseas and by 74 per cent of all inbound visits. Just over a quarter of all passengers are travelling on business. The advent of no-frills carriers has had significant a significant effect on passenger travel profiles, with strong growth in business travel from regional airports, and a significant increase in inbound traffic generated for the purposes of non-UK residents visiting friends and relatives based in the UK. Whilst these carriers have been perceived to democratise air travel, providing the opportunity for lower income groups to travel more often, the main result is actually that middle and higher income groups travel more often, and often for shorter trips.

The United Kingdom has a low usage for domestic (internal) flights, and after a high in 2005/06, has been in decline. In the year 2010/11 just 18.4 million internal passengers were carried (compared with 1,352 million rail journeys in the same period). Air's share of passengers has reduced significantly on certain key routes. For example, for London to Manchester, rail's market share (rail v. air passenger journeys) rose from 69% in 2008 to 79% in 2010; for Birmingham to Edinburgh, rail's market share rose from 14% in 2008 to 31% in 2010; and for London to Glasgow, rail's market share has risen from 12% in 2008 to 20% in 2010; although air still remains the leader on many London to Scotland journeys.

International air travel

Future of air transport

The current availability of airport capacity has been identified as an important constraint on the ability to meet the increasing demand for air travel. In many cases airport capacity is already fully used in meeting current demand. At Heathrow and Gatwick airports the runways are full for "… virtually the whole day". In 2003 the runway at Birmingham airport was expected to reach full capacity by 2009 at the latest, whilst terminal capacity at Edinburgh airport had reached its limit. Government forecasts that year suggested that by 2030 the number of passengers could rise to between 400mppa (million people per annum) and 600mppa, representing a two- to threefold increase, and a figure of 500mppa by 2030 was regarded by the Government as "robust". In 2006 the Government reported that at 228mppa the demand for air travel the previous year was in line with the 2003 forecast, but also revised the forecast demand for 2030 downwards to 465mppa as a result of capacity constraints, even taking into account proposed airport developments.

Policy

In December 2003 the Government published The Future of Air Transport White Paper which detailed the Government's approach to the future development of air transport. The White Paper does not in itself authorise or preclude any development, but seeks instead to define a "national strategic framework for the future development of airport capacity" over the next 30 years. The principal conclusion is that the two extremes of failing to provide additional airport capacity, and encouraging growth without regard for the wider impacts, are equally unacceptable options. Instead a "balanced and measured approach" to the future of air transport in the UK is adopted. The Government's approach is designed to cater for the forecast growth in demand, thus supporting economic prosperity nationally and enabling ordinary people to travel at reasonable cost, whilst at the same time managing and mitigating the environmental impacts of aviation and ensuring that the costs associated with them are reflected in the price of air travel (see detailed sections below). In December 2006 the Government published the Air Transport White Paper Progress Report 2006 to report on progress made in "… delivering a sustainable future for aviation." The report re-iterates the Government's commitment to the strategy defined in the original White Paper, stating that it "… strikes the right balance between economic, social and environmental goals."

In 2010 the new Coalition Government abandoned the approach taken in the White Paper and ruled out further airport expansion of London's three main airports (Heathrow, Gatwick and Stansted). On 31 October 2011 at the Airport Operators Association, the Labour Party's Shadow transport secretary Maria Eagle announced that the Party had abandoned its support for a third runway at Heathrow Airport but said that the Government must also drop its moratorium on new airport capacity in the South East.

On 2 November 2011 the Thames Hub proposal was launched by Lord Foster. This attempts to integrate several infrastructure components (flood barrier, hydroelectric generation, rail lines) and includes plans for one of the World's largest airports. It would be capable of handling 150 million passengers a year, have 4 runways and be built on a platform in the Hoo Peninsula in Kent.

Environmental impact

Whilst carbon emissions from all UK activities other than aviation had declined by 9 per cent in the 10 years between 1990 and 2000, carbon emissions from aviation activities doubled in the same period. Air transport in the UK accounted for 6.3 per cent of all UK carbon emissions in 2006. When the radiative forcing impact of other emissions are taken into account the total impact of emissions attributable to aviation is estimated to be twice that of its carbon emissions alone. Although the Government has committed to reducing total UK carbon emissions by 80 per cent from existing levels by 2050, its policy is based on the use of "… economic instruments to ensure that growing industries are catered for within a reducing total." Even if this reduction in total carbon emissions is achieved, research published in February 2006 concluded that aviation could account for between 24 per cent and 50 per cent of the UK's carbon budget by 2050. The strategy adopted in the White Paper seeks to mitigate the global impact of air transport primarily through emissions trading schemes. Although the Kyoto Protocol implemented emissions trading as a means to reduce emissions at national levels, the global nature of air transport means that international (but not domestic) air travel is excluded from this mechanism. The Government is seeking to redress this through the International Civil Aviation Organization (ICAO), but progress is slow. In the meantime efforts are being made to include aviation in the EU Emission Trading Scheme with an original target to implement this by 2008. In 2006 the Government re-affirmed this policy as the best approach for addressing the climate change impacts of aviation, and current proposals aim at accomplishing this for all flights within the EU by 2011, with the scheme being extended to include all flights to and from the EU the following year.

Critics of the Government's policy advocate addressing climate change impacts by constraining demand for air travel. The study Predict and Decide - Aviation, climate change and UK policy concludes that the Government should seek an alternative aviation policy based on managing demand rather than providing for it. This would be accomplished via a strategy that presumes "… against the expansion of UK airport capacity" and restrains demand by the use of economic instruments to price air travel less attractively. Other studies point to a significant contribution to aviation's climate change emissions by the social phenomenon hypermobility, and the increasing prevalence of hypermobility among UK and global citizens. and Mander & Randles (2009). Key to the concerns expressed in these studies are: that vast distances are easily travelled in a relatively short time, entailing substantial greenhouse gas emissions; that these emissions are made at-altitude where they have much greater climate consequences than emissions made at ground-level; and that social pressures and marketing programs such as frequent flyer miles programs that both encourage a growing amount of travel and means to go.

Climate scientist Kevin Anderson of the Tyndall Centre for Climate Change Research demonstrated in 2009 that continued annual growth in UK air travel at the usual seven percent until 2012 and at three percent thereafter will lead to such travel consuming 70 percent of the UK's total planned national carbon emissions by 2030. In that less-than-business-as-usual scenario, UK air travel emissions would increase from 11 MT in 2006, to 17 MT in 2012, and 28 MT in 2030. His contention is that the consequences of not promptly reducing the demand or supply for air travel in the UK and elsewhere will result in severe consequences for society and the ecosystems upon which humanity depends.

See also
 2010 eruption of Eyjafjallajökull

References

Bibliography

External links
Animation of UK air traffic